The Southern Kantō proportional representation block is one of eleven proportional representation (PR) "blocks", multi-member constituencies for the House of Representatives in the Diet of Japan. It consists of Southern parts of the Kantō region covering Chiba, Kanagawa and Yamanashi prefectures. Following the introduction of proportional voting it initially elected 23 representatives in the 1996 general election, then 21 after the total number of PR seats had been reduced from 200 to 180, and 22 representatives since the reapportionment of 2002.

Summary of results 
With a district magnitude of 22, Southern Kantō is the second largest PR block behind Kinki and gives smaller parties an opportunity to pick up seats.

Party names are abbreviated as follows (format: abbreviation, translated name, Japanese name, English name):
 DPJ "Democratic Party", Minshutō, Democratic of Japan
 LDP Liberal Democratic Party, Jiyūminshutō
 Kōmeitō "Justice Party", Kōmeitō, New Justice Party Party
 JCP Japanese Communist Party, Nihon Kyōsantō
 SDP Social Democratic Party, Shakaiminshutō
 NFP New Frontier Party, Shinshintō
 LP Liberal Party, Jiyūtō
 NSP New Socialist Party, Shin-shakaitō
 LL Liberal League, Jiyū-rengō
 HRP Happiness Realization Party, Kōfuku-jitsugen-tō

List of representatives
Note: Party affiliations as of election day.

Election result 2009

References 

 The Senkyo: Results of general and by-elections for the House of Representatives since 1890
 Yomiuri Shimbun: Southern Kantō results 2005, 2009, 2012

Kantō region
PR Southern Kanto